Narbonne is a railway station in Narbonne, Occitanie, France. The station opened on 22 April 1857 and is on the Bordeaux–Sète railway and Narbonne–Portbou railway lines. The station is served by TGV (high speed), Intercités (long distance, also night train) and TER (local) services operated by the SNCF. The line was electrified through Narbonne in 1935.

The station is at an important 3-way junction, with both passenger and freight services coming from Toulouse, Nîmes, Perpignan and Spain (via Portbou). Some trains avoid the station, by a curve between the Toulouse and Perpignan lines.

Train services
The following services currently call at Narbonne (2022):

High speed services (TGV)
Paris–Valence–Nîmes–Montpellier–Perpignan–Barcelona
 Lyon–Nîmes–Montpellier–Perpignan–Barcelona
Marseille–Nîmes–Montpellier–Perpignan–Barcelona–Madrid 
Lyon–Nîmes–Montpellier–Toulouse
Intercity service (Intercités)
Bordeaux–Toulouse–Montpellier–Marseille 
Night services (Intercités de nuit)
Paris–Carcassonne–Narbonne–Cerbère
Local service (TER Occitanie)
Narbonne–Béziers–Montpellier–Nîmes–Avignon
Toulouse–Carcassonne–Narbonne
Cerbère–Perpignan–Narbonne
Express service (TER Occitanie)
Cerbère–Perpignan–Narbonne–Montpellier–Nîmes–Avignon
Narbonne–Montpellier–Nîmes–Arles–Marseille

Gallery

References

Railway stations in Aude
Railway stations in France opened in 1857